During World War II, some individuals and groups helped Romani people and others escape the Porajmos conducted by Nazi Germany.

In Crimea, the Crimean Tatars have been credited with helping the Romani people during WWII.

References

See also
Rescue of Jews during the Holocaust